Jitesh Antapurkar is a leader of Indian National Congress and a member of the Maharashtra Legislative Assembly elected from Deglur Assembly constituency in Nanded city.

Positions held
 2021: Elected Bypoll to Maharashtra Legislative Assembly.

References

Living people
Members of the Maharashtra Legislative Assembly
Indian National Congress politicians from Maharashtra
People from Nanded

Year of birth missing (living people)